Hālawa station (also known as Aloha Stadium station) is an under construction Honolulu Rail Transit station in Halawa, Hawaii, serving Aloha Stadium, Aiea, Salt Lake, and Moanalua. When completed, it will have 600 park and ride spaces.

The Hawaiian Station Name Working Group proposed Hawaiian names for the nine rail stations on the Ewa end of the rail system (stations west of and including Aloha Stadium) in November 2017, and HART adopted the proposed names on February 22, 2018. Hālawa means "curve" and refers to the last ahupuaʻa in the ʻEwa District.

References

External links
 

Aiea, Hawaii
Honolulu Rail Transit stations
Railway stations scheduled to open in 2023